Nephi is a city in Juab County, Utah, United States. It is part of the Provo–Orem metropolitan area. The population was 6,443 at the 2020 census. It is the county seat of Juab County. It was settled by Mormon pioneers in 1851 as Salt Creek, and it acquired its current name in 1882. It is the principal city in the Juab Valley, an agricultural area. Nephi was named after Nephi, son of Lehi, from the Book of Mormon.

History 
Before the area was settled, the site along Salt Creek was first a camping place along the Old Mormon Road to Southern California. Mormon settlers established a settlement at the site in 1851, naming it after the creek. It retained that name until 1882 when the town and its post office became Nephi.

Geography and climate
Nephi is in eastern Juab County in the Juab Valley, between the Wasatch and San Pitch Mountains to the east and the lower West Hills and Long Ridge to the west. Interstate 15 runs along the eastern edge of the city, with access from Exits 222, 225, and 228. I-15 leads north  to Spanish Fork and south  to Scipio. Utah State Route 28, Nephi's Main Street, runs north  to I-15 and south  to Gunnison. Utah State Route 132 crosses Main Street in the center of town, leading southeast  to Moroni and southwest  to Leamington.

Climate

In the Köppen climate classification, Nephi has either a humid subtropical climate (Cfa) or humid continental climate (Dfa) depending on which variant of the system is used.

Demographics

As of the census of 2000, there were 4,733 people, 1,430 households, and 1,149 families residing in the city. The population density was 1,133.8 people per square mile (438.2/km2). There were 1,552 housing units at an average density of 371.8 per square mile (143.7/km2). The racial makeup of the city was 96.98% White, 0.11% African American, 0.63% Native American, 0.46% Asian, 0.02% Pacific Islander, 0.97% from other races, and 0.82% from two or more races. Hispanic or Latino of any race were 2.45% of the population.

There were 1,430 households, out of which 50.1% had children under the age of 18 living with them, 71.1% were married couples living together, 6.2% had a female householder with no husband present, and 19.6% were non-families. 18.3% of all households were made up of individuals, and 9.6% had someone living alone who was 65 years of age or older. The average household size was 3.24 and the average family size was 3.72.

In the city, the population was spread out, with 37.8% under the age of 18, 9.0% from 18 to 24, 25.4% from 25 to 44, 16.9% from 45 to 64, and 10.9% who were 65 years of age or older. The median age was 28 years. For every 100 females, there were 101.2 males. For every 100 females age 18 and over, there were 96.0 males.

The median income for a household in the city was $38,918, and the median income for a family was $43,327. Males had a median income of $34,792 versus $21,027 for females. The per capita income for the city was $13,154. About 7.5% of families and 10.0% of the population were below the poverty line, including 8.7% of those under age 18 and 18.2% of those age 65 or over.

Notable people
 Roger Boisjoly, engineer who tried to prevent Space Shuttle Challenger from launching, lived his final years in Nephi.
 Brandon Flowers of The Killers lived in Nephi from age 8 until his junior year in Juab High School. The band's seventh studio album Pressure Machine is a concept album about life in Nephi and features spoken word interviews with town residents.

See also

 List of cities and towns in Utah

References

External links

 

Cities in Utah
County seats in Utah
Cities in Juab County, Utah
Provo–Orem metropolitan area
Populated places established in 1851
1851 establishments in Utah Territory